Nathan Lincoln Hecht (born August 15, 1949) is the chief justice of the Supreme Court of Texas. A Republican from Dallas, Hecht was first elected to the Supreme Court in 1988 and was reelected to six-year terms in 1994, 2000 and 2006. He secured his fifth six-year term on November 6, 2012. He was appointed chief justice by Governor Rick Perry on September 10, 2013, and was sworn into that position by retiring Chief Justice Wallace B. Jefferson on October 1, 2013.

Background

Chief Justice Hecht was born in Clovis, New Mexico to a farming family, and graduated from Clovis public schools. He earned his Bachelor of Arts from Yale University in New Haven, Connecticut, with honors in Philosophy and graduated thereafter cum laude from the Southern Methodist University Dedman School of Law. He was a law clerk to Judge Roger Robb of the United States Court of Appeals for the District of Columbia Circuit. He served as a lieutenant in the U.S. Naval Reserve. He practiced law in the area of general litigation with the Dallas firm of Locke Purnell Boren Laney & Neely, and was a shareholder in that firm prior to his appointment to the bench.

While on the District Court, Chief Justice Hecht was the local administrative judge, presiding over all county and district judges in Dallas County and representing them before other branches of government.

He began his judicial service on the 95th District Court of Dallas County, to which he was appointed by Governor Bill Clements, on September 1, 1981, elected in 1982, and re-elected in 1984. In 1986, he was elected to the Texas Court of Appeals for the Fifth District of Texas at Dallas, where he served until his election to the Supreme Court.  Throughout his tenure on the Supreme Court, Hecht has been designated to oversee all changes in state court rules.

Harriet Miers nomination

In the days after the October 3, 2005, nomination of Harriet Miers to be an associate justice of the United States Supreme Court, Hecht became nationally known as a strong supporter of White House Counsel Miers based upon his long friendship with her.  According to Hecht, he and Miers dated in the past and were members of the same church.  Hecht gave 120 interviews in support of the eventually-unsuccessful nomination.

The New York Times has reported that, on the day of Miers' nomination, Hecht participated in a conference call with the Arlington Group, a coalition of Christian conservatives, assuring them of her pro-life views.

In May 2006, Hecht was admonished by the Texas State Commission on Judicial Conduct for "an improper use of his office and position to promote Miers's private interest" during the nomination; a three-judge panel exonerated Hecht of the charge after he appealed the decision.

In March 2007, Hecht said that he had asked then Texas State Representative Tony Goolsby to propose a bill that would make the state reimburse his $340,000 legal fees acquired from the case before the Texas State Commission on Judicial Conduct. His lawyers had discounted his fees by $167,500.  Goolsby withdrew the bill after learning that Hecht had already been reimbursed for the bill through "donations." Hecht defended his position by saying, "Here is the problem: If judges are sanctioned like this and it's unjust and it's wrong and they want to prove it, they can represent themselves or hire a lawyer that you can't pay for on a judge's salary." He is paid $152,500.

In December 2008, he was fined $29,000 by the Texas Ethics Commission in connection with the discount, which the Commission ruled was an improper political contribution.  Hecht has filed an appeal of the decision in Travis County District Court, which removed the fine.  The appeal was filed in January 2009 and it began the whole process over again.  After nearly eight years, in August 2016 the Texas Ethics Commission and Hecht settled the case.  Neither side was deemed to have prevailed, but Hecht did agree to pay a $1,000 fine.

Memberships, awards and community service

Hecht is a member of the American Law Institute, a member of the Texas Philosophical Society, and a fellow of the Texas and American Bar Foundations. He is on the advisory board of the S.M.U. Law Review and was named Outstanding Young Lawyer in 1984 by the Dallas Association of Young Lawyers.  Musically talented, Hecht has played the organ for his non-denominational Christian church.

Election of 2012

In the November 6 general election, Hecht polled 4,116,102 votes (53.7 percent), compared to 3,208,479 (41.9) percent for the Democrat Michele Petty. Two minor candidates held the remaining 4.4 percent of the ballots. Hecht lost his own county of Dallas, in which he polled 273,105 votes (40.2 percent), compared to Petty's 382,140 (56.2 percent). However, he won neighboring Tarrant County, which includes Fort Worth.

Election of 2014

Hecht, backed by U.S. Senator Ted Cruz, easily won re-nomination as chief justice in the Republican primary election held on March 4, 2014. He polled 707,692 (60.5 percent); his challenger, former State Representative Robert Talton of Pasadena in Harris County, received 462,273 votes (39.5 percent).

In the November 4 general election, Justice Hecht defeated William Moody, who ran unopposed in the Democratic party primary. With 426,898 primary votes, Moody ran 281,000 below Hecht's Republican primary total.

Though Hecht himself has benefited from straight ticket voting for his court position, the justice has called for abolition of master levers for political parties on voting machines in Texas. According to Hecht, on November 8, 2016,

many good judges [such as Laura Parker in Bexar County) lost solely because voters in their districts preferred a presidential candidate (Hillary Rodham Clinton carried Bexar County.) in the other party. These kinds of partisan sweeps are common, with judicial candidates at the mercy of the top of the ticket. Such partisan sweeps are demoralizing to judges and disruptive to the legal system. But worse than that, when partisan politics is the driving force, and the political climate is as harsh as ours has become, judicial elections make judges more political, and judicial independence is the casualty.

Former Chief Justices Wallace Jefferson, Thomas R. Phillips, and John Luke Hill, the last Democrat in the position, have also called for reforms in the selection of judges. Joe Straus, the Moderate Republican Speaker of the Texas House of Representatives has urged that straight ticket voting be abolished for all elections, not just judicial ones.

External links 
 Justice Hecht's profile on the Texas Supreme Court website
 http://ltn-archive.hotresponse.com/may02/snap_shot_p14.html
 https://web.archive.org/web/20051022024226/http://www.supreme.courts.state.tx.us/rules/tdr/disccle3.htm
 http://www.chron.com/disp/story.mpl/metropolitan/3884465.html

References

|-

1949 births
21st-century American judges
Chief Justices of the Texas Supreme Court
Living people
People from Clovis, New Mexico
Military personnel from Dallas
Southern Methodist University alumni
Texas lawyers
Texas Republicans
Texas state court judges
Justices of the Texas Supreme Court
United States Navy officers
Yale University alumni